The Perez Smith House is a historic house at 46 Lincoln Street in Waltham, Massachusetts. The 2½ story wood-frame house was built in 1851 and is one of the city's finest transitional Greek Revival/Italianate houses. It has a typical Italianate three-bay facade, deep cornice with decorative brackets, and round-arch windows in the gable. It also has Greek Revival pilastered cornerboards, and its center entry is flanked by sidelight windows and topped by a transom window and paneled sunburst. Its windows are topped by heavy corniced lintels.

The house was listed on the National Register of Historic Places in 1989.

See also
National Register of Historic Places listings in Waltham, Massachusetts

References

Houses in Waltham, Massachusetts
Houses on the National Register of Historic Places in Waltham, Massachusetts
Italianate architecture in Massachusetts
Houses completed in 1851
1851 establishments in Massachusetts